Ronald R. Bouchard (November 23, 1948December 10, 2015) was an American NASCAR driver who was the 1981 NASCAR Winston Cup Rookie of the Year. His brother Ken Bouchard was the 1988 NASCAR Winston Cup Rookie of the Year.  His father-in-law, Ed Flemke Sr., and brother-in-law, Ed Flemke Jr., were also NASCAR Modified racers.

Local driving career
Ron Bouchard began racing career at Brookline Speedway as a substitute driver in 1963 by replacing the ill driver for his father's car. After high school he began racing in his father's car, and he rapidly moved up the ranks to late models at Seekonk Speedway. He claimed five consecutive track championships from 1967 to 1971. He began racing at other local tracks in the Camaro, and he was noticed by Bob Johnson.

Johnson quickly put Bouchard in his modified car at the famous Stafford Speedway, and he won his first of his 35 career victories at Stafford in April 1972. He won the 1973 and 1979 track modified championships.  Bouchard also drove for car owners Bob Judkins (No. 2x, grandfather of former JTG Daugherty Racing driver Ryan Preece) and also Len Boehler (No. 3), where he won numerous races at Stafford Speedway, Thompson Speedway, Seekonk Speedway, Waterford Speedbowl and Westboro Speedway. One of Bouchard's biggest modified victories came at Thompson Speedway driving Dick Armstrong's No. 1 in the Thompson 300 in 1980.

Bouchard was also a notable rival of fellow New Englander, Geoffrey Bodine, whom he beat several times for modified victories and vice versa. Bodine also beat Bouchard in the NASCAR race at Martinsville in 1984. In spite of their rivalry, however, Bodine recommended Bouchard when Hendrick Motorsports began their Busch Series program later in 1984, allowing Bouchard to drive one race for the team.

NASCAR career

Bouchard began his NASCAR career in 1981 in the No. 47 J.D. Stacy Buick for owner Jack Beebe (Race Hill Farm team). He captured the 1981 NASCAR Rookie of the Year title even though he only raced in 22 of 31 events. He posted 12 top 10 finishes in the 22 races, including his only career win, in the Talladega 500 at Talladega Superspeedway. Running third to Darrell Waltrip and Terry Labonte on the last lap, he swooped under both of them as they battled side by side out of the final turn.  The three cars crossed the finish line nearly simultaneously, with Bouchard winning in a photo finish. After the race, Waltrip, who had been watching Labonte and not seen Bouchard pass him, asked, "Where the hell did he come from?" Waltrip has stated in interviews over the race that part of the reason he lost was because he did not try to block Bouchard as he believed that Bouchard was a lap down.

Bouchard's victory is considered by many as the biggest upset in NASCAR history and the win essentially clinched the Cup Series rookie of the year award for Bouchard. In 1982 Bouchard finished a career-high eighth in the final points standing with 15 top 10 finishes in 30 races. He ran full-time in 1983, 1984, and 1985. He finished between eleventh and sixteenth in the final points standing each of those years. Bouchard also came close to winning races at Martinsville in 1984 (finishing second to Geoffrey Bodine) and Rockingham in 1985 (where the roles of Talladega were reversed and he finished second to Waltrip).

In 1986 he changed to the No. 98 Valvoline Pontiac for owner Mike Curb (Curb-Agajanian Motorsports). The team generally finished in the top 20 when they completed a race, but they had 9 DNFs (did not finish) in their 17 events.

In 1987 he raced in the No. 1 Bull's Eye Barbecue Sauce Chevrolet for owner Hoss Ellington in five events. Their two finishes were eighth and twelfth.

Awards
In 1998 he was inducted into the New England Auto Racers Hall of Fame in its inaugural class.

In 2016, New England Auto Racers Hall of Fame began awarding the Ron Bouchard Award for lifetime service to motorsport in the area.

After racing
After racing in Winston Cup, Bouchard returned home to Fitchburg, Massachusetts, opening Ron Bouchard's Auto Stores, which currently represents  Honda, Stellantis, Hyundai, and Nissan.

Bouchard married Paula Flemke, daughter of New England Modified racer "Steady" Ed Flemke, Sr. and sister to Ed Flemke Jr, in June 1983.  The couple had five children—Eugene, Robert, Michelle, Tracey, and Chad.

In September 2015, Bouchard opened a museum at his Stellantis dealership celebrating his motorsport history, three months before his death to cancer on December 10, 2015.

Motorsports career results

NASCAR
(key) (Bold – Pole position awarded by qualifying time. Italics – Pole position earned by points standings or practice time. * – Most laps led.)

Winston Cup Series

Daytona 500

Busch Series

References

External links

Ron's Biography 
Bouchard's auto dealership and museum

1948 births
2015 deaths
NASCAR drivers
Sportspeople from Fitchburg, Massachusetts
Racing drivers from Massachusetts
Deaths from cancer in Massachusetts
Massachusetts automobile salespeople